Splendrillia larochei is a species of sea snail, a marine gastropod mollusk in the family Drilliidae.

Description
The length of the shell attains 16 mm, its diameter 3 mm.

Distribution
This marine species is endemic to New Zealand and occurs off Off Three Kings Islands, off Awanui Heads and off Rangaunu Bay

References

 Powell, A.W.B. 1940: The Marine Mollusca of the Aupourian Province, New Zealand, Transactions and Proceedings of the Royal Society of New Zealand, 70
 Powell, A.W.B. 1979: New Zealand Mollusca: Marine, Land and Freshwater Shells, Collins, Auckland

External links
  Tucker, J.K. 2004 Catalog of recent and fossil turrids (Mollusca: Gastropoda). Zootaxa 682:1–1295.
   Spencer H.G., Willan R.C., Marshall B.A. & Murray T.J. (2011). Checklist of the Recent Mollusca Recorded from the New Zealand Exclusive Economic Zone

larochei
Gastropods of New Zealand
Gastropods described in 1940